This is list of archives in Greece.

Archives in Greece 

 General Archives of the State
 Greek Film Archive

See also 

 List of archives
 List of museums in Greece
 Culture of Greece

External links 

 
Archives
Greece
Archives